Traber is a German surname, meaning trotter, a horse trained for harness racing. It can also be of English origin, as variant of Trabert. It is most prevalent in Germany, Switzerland and the United States.

Notable people
Notable people with this surname include:
 Billy Traber, American baseball player
 Falko Traber, German high wire artist
 Jim Traber, American baseball player
 Gregor Traber, German athlete
 Maret G. Traber, American biochemist
 Peter G. Traber, American executive
 Zacharias Traber, Austrian Jesuit

References